Jens Knippschild and Peter Nyborg were the defending champions but did not compete that year.

Karsten Braasch and Sargis Sargsian won in the final 7–6(9–7), 6–2 against Simon Aspelin and Jeff Coetzee.

Seeds

  Lucas Arnold /  Mariano Hood (semifinals)
  František Čermák /  David Škoch (first round)
  Simon Aspelin /  Jeff Coetzee (final)
  Devin Bowen /  Ashley Fisher (first round)

Draw

External links
 2003 BCR Open Romania Doubles draw

Romanian Open
Doubles
2003 in Romanian tennis